Christopher Alan Boardman (11 June 1903 Norwich – 29 September 1987) was a British sailor who won gold in the 1936 Summer Olympics.

In 1936, he was a crew member and helmsman of the British boat Lalage which won the gold medal in the 6 metre class. As gold medallist he was presented with an oak sapling which he planted at How Hill.

In 1934, Boardman was a member of the crew of the British J-class yacht Endeavour which competed in the America's Cup off the coast of Rhode Island. The Endeavour won the first two races but lost the remaining three.

In World War II, he saw service as a Royal Naval Volunteer Reserve officer. In 1940/41 he served on the Q-ship HMS Cyprus (X44) (formerly Cape Sable) and later commanded the corvette HMS Snowdrop.

His younger brother, Humphrey, rowed in the double scull event at the 1928 Olympic games and won double gold at the 1930 British Empire Games. Their father, Edward Thomas Boardman, was a Norwich architect, as was, their grandfather Edward Boardman. Their mother, Florence, was a daughter of J J Colman of the Colman's Mustard family. The family home was at How Hill in the Norfolk village of Ludham.

References

External links
 
 
 

1903 births
1987 deaths
British male sailors (sport)
Olympic sailors of Great Britain
Sailors at the 1936 Summer Olympics – 6 Metre
Olympic gold medallists for Great Britain
English Olympic medallists
Alumni of Trinity College, Cambridge
Olympic medalists in sailing
People from Ludham
Medalists at the 1936 Summer Olympics
Military personnel from Norwich
Royal Navy officers of World War II
Royal Navy officers
Royal Naval Volunteer Reserve personnel of World War II